Erlend Caspersen (born 1982) is a Norwegian bassist who currently plays in Abhorrent. He also played for Deeds of Flesh and Spawn of Possession. He is notable for his aggressive bass tone and highly technical playing, with a very varied range of techniques, including two-handed tapping, sweeping, and slapping.

Biography
Caspersen started playing bass when he was twelve; for his 12th birthday he bought a bass (his first) instead of a planned bicycle, because a lot of his friends were in bands. He cited Victor Wooten, Les Claypool and Alex Webster as his biggest influences. Alex Webster cited him as the best death metal bass player of his generation. Caspersen is best known for his work with bands such as Spawn of Possession and Blood Red Throne. He also did a number of session jobs for bands like Vile, Decrepit Birth, and Incinerate.

He also has a YouTube channel where he covers some Spawn of Possession songs like 'Dead and Grotesque' as well as songs from the album on which he played bass for the band, Spawn of Possession.

Equipment
Caspersen is endorsed by Warwick basses. His main bass is the 5-string Warwick Corvette $$ Neck-Through bubinga model, which he runs through Sansamp bass driver DI int
 6-string fretless Warwick Thumb NT
 5-string Warwick $$ Corvette NT
 6-string Warwick Thumb NT

Discography (major)
Spawn of Possession
 Incurso (2012)
Blood Red Throne
 Monument of Death (2001)
 Affiliated with the Suffering (2003)
 Altered Genesis (2005)
 Come Death (2007)
 Souls of Damnation (2009)
Other
 Dismal Euphony - Python Zero (2001)
 Emeth - Telesis (2008)
 Deeds of Flesh - Of What's to Come (2008)
 The Allseeing I - Holodemiurgia (2008)
 Incinerate - Anatomize (2008)
 Igorrr - Savage Sinusoid
 Igorrr - Spirituality and Distortion

Notes

External links
 warwickbass.com

1982 births
Living people
Norwegian musicians
Scandinavian musicians
Norwegian rock bass guitarists
Norwegian male bass guitarists
Place of birth missing (living people)
21st-century Norwegian bass guitarists
21st-century Norwegian male musicians
Blood Red Throne members